Elizabeth Lamb is the name of:

 Elizabeth Lamb, Viscountess Melbourne (1750–1818), political hostess, wife of Peniston Lamb, 1st Viscount Melbourne
 Elizabeth Lamb (athlete) (born 1991), New Zealand high jumper